Harry Vaulkhard (born 14 October 1985) is a British racing driver. In 2010 he raced in the World Touring Car Championship for Bamboo Engineering.

Career

Early career

Harry's father, Nigel Vaulkhard, was a successful businessman in the Tyneside area, owning and operating a number of bars, and was also a keen classic touring car racer. Harry is a former motocross competitor, who began circuit racing in cars in 2004, by racing in the Northern Sports & Saloon Championship. For 2005 he switched to the SEAT Cupra Championship, with JS Motorsport. In 2006 he finished 9th overall, for the 2005 series winners Triple-R.

British Touring Car Championship
His graduation to the British Touring Car Championship for 2008 with Robertshaw Racing was confirmed in December 2007. His team-mates in the expanded team were the more experienced Matt Allison in another Lacetti, and Alan Taylor in a Honda Integra. Vaulkhard qualified 10th at Donington Park but scored no points.

Both Lacettis were owned by Nigel Vaulkhard, and the Robertshaw team did not run them in 2009.

World Touring Car Championship
Bamboo and Vaulkhard moved to the World Touring Car Championship in 2010, with Darryl O'Young as teammate. At the third round in Monza he scored his and the team's first victory in the Independents' Trophy, as well as a main championship point for 10th overall. After the seventh round of the season he was forced to call time on his 2010 campaign due to a lack of funding. He will continue to attend WTCC events with the squad and is hopeful of finding the backing to return to racing for the final two rounds at Okayama and Macau.

Other series
In 2012 Vaulkhard competed in four races in the 2012 Racecar Euro Series, driving a Chevrolet Impala for Team FJ. He also competed in four races in the Golf GTi Championship that year, scoring three podium finishes. In 2013 he went on to become the Touch of Mojo Golf GTi Champion. In 2014 he signed with Team HARD to race in the VW Cup under the PPCGB.com Racing banner. He also raced in the Suzuki Swift Sport Championship at the 2014 British Rallycross Championship final meeting at Croft.

Since 2011 Vaulkhard has commentated on the World Touring Car Championship for Eurosport.

Since 2020, Harry has competed within the British rallycross championships after a season of competing in the north east autocross championship which is run by Cramlington and District Motor Club.

Racing record

Career summary

Complete British Touring Car Championship results
(key) (Races in bold indicate pole position – 1 point awarded in first race) (Races in italics indicate fastest lap – 1 point awarded all races) (* signifies that driver lead race for at least one lap – 1 point awarded all races)

Complete World Touring Car Championship results
(key) (Races in bold indicate pole position) (Races in italics indicate fastest lap)

References
Career statistics from driverdb.com, retrieved on 4 May 2008.

External links

Old official website
Profile at BTCCPages.com

1985 births
Living people
English racing drivers
British Touring Car Championship drivers
World Touring Car Championship drivers
European Touring Car Cup drivers
Mini Challenge UK drivers
Craft-Bamboo Racing drivers